Jalalpur is a village in Tekari block of Gaya district, Bihar, India.  The population was 5,256 at the 2011 Indian census.

References

Villages in Gaya district